Marek Twardowski (born 6 October 1979 in Białystok) is a Polish sprint canoeist who has competed since the late 1990s. He won fifteen medals at the ICF Canoe Sprint World Championships with two golds (K-1 500 m: 2006, K-2 500 m: 1999), nine silvers (K-2 200 m: 2002, 2003, 2006; K-2 500 m: 2002, 2005; K-2 1000 m: 1999, K-4 200 m: 1999, K-4 1000 m: 2006, 2007), and four bronzes (K-1 500 m: 2007, K-2 200 m: 1999, 2005; K-4 1000 m: 2007).

Twardowski also competed in three Summer Olympics, earning his best finish of fourth in the K-2 500 m event at Athens in 2004.

Nicknamed Twardy, he is 1.82 m (6'0) tall and weighs 85 kg (187 lbs). Twardowski is a member of the Sparta Augustów club where he is coached by Andrzej Siemion.

On 9 July 2008 he was named the Polish national flag bearer for the 2008 Summer Olympics in Beijing.

References

1979 births
Canoeists at the 2000 Summer Olympics
Canoeists at the 2004 Summer Olympics
Canoeists at the 2008 Summer Olympics
Living people
Olympic canoeists of Poland
Polish male canoeists
Sportspeople from Białystok
ICF Canoe Sprint World Championships medalists in kayak